Argungu is a city in Nigeria's Kebbi State, situated on the Sokoto River. As of 2007 Argungu had an estimated population of 47,064. 
The city is the seat of the Argungu Emirate, a traditional state.
The city is a major agricultural center for the area, with key crops including tobacco, peanuts, rice, millet, wheat, and sorghum.  The city also hosts an annual international fishing festival which was suspended for 11 years. The Argungu fishing festival was held again in the year 2020 from March 11–14

History

After the Hausa state of Kebbi was conquered by the Fulani Empire in 1808, Kebbi's rulers fled to Argungu to found a new emirate. Though the neighboring Hausa state of Gwandu conquered Kebbi in 1831, it was unable to fully secure control of Argungu, and a series of revolts followed. By the end of the century, Argungu had become a de facto independent state, though it was again conquered by the British in 1902.

Museum

The building of the Kanta Museum, adjacent to the main market was built in 1831 and named after Muhammadu Kanta, who founded the Kebbi Kingdom in 1515. It was erected by Yakubu Nabame, a former Emir of Kebbi, and served as the Emir's palace until 1942 when the British built a new administrative palace during the reign of Muhammed Sani.  After the building became vacant, on July 1, 1958, it opened as a museum, offering an insight into the turbulent history of Kebbi State. The museum is divided into eleven compartments and has a notable collection of weapons, consisting of charms, spears, swords, wood, stones, bows and arrows, local guns and even drums on display. The museum is also known to be a place where dead emirs of the local government are buried.

See also
Argungu Fishing Festival

References

Local Government Areas in Kebbi State